The Canon EF-S 18–55mm lens 3.5–5.6 is a Canon-produced wide-angle to mid telephoto zoom lens for digital single-lens reflex cameras with an EF-S lens mount. The field of view has a 35 mm equivalent focal length of 28.8–88mm, and it is a standard kit lens on Canon's consumer APS-C DSLRs. In February 2017 Canon announced the new Canon EF-S 18–55mm lens 4–5.6 IS STM with a smaller aperture, which made the lens 20% smaller according to Canon.

There have been nine iterations of this lens, five of which are discontinued and four of which are currently in production: III (kit only and most 'basic'), IS II, and the two IS STM lenses.
 I USM (discontinued)
 I (discontinued)
 II USM (discontinued)
 II (discontinued)
 IS (discontinued)
 IS II (current)
 III (current)
 IS STM (the most popular) (current)
 4-5.6 IS STM (current)

EF-S 18–55mm USM I/II / EF-S 18–55mm I/II
The lens body has a plastic construction, including the lens mount. Generally, however, this version of the lens is soft and must be stopped down to gain acceptable sharpness. Barrel distortion becomes quite noticeable at the wide-angle setting and chromatic aberration (purple fringing) is common.

EF-S 18–55mm IS I/II
On 20 August 2007, the EF-S 18-55m IS was announced along with the EOS 40D. The lens featured improved optical quality over previous versions and added image stabilization.

On 7 February 2011, the 18–55mm 1:3.5–5.6 IS II was announced to be bundled with the EOS 600D and 1100D.

EF-S 18–55mm IS STM
On 21 March 2013, the 18–55mm 3.5–5.6 IS STM was announced alongside the EOS 700D/Rebel T5i and 100D/Rebel SL1. It has a different optical formula from that of any previous Canon 18–55mm lens, and includes Canon's STM (stepping motor) technology, claimed by the company to offer quieter continuous autofocus while shooting video when attached to bodies that have Canon's hybrid autofocus sensor technology. The STM is also the first 18–55mm version with an internal focusing design. At introduction, it was offered as a kit lens on both the 700D and 100D; it has since become one of two alternative kit lenses for the 70D.

EF-S 18–55mm 4–5.6 IS STM
On 14 February 2017, the 18–55mm 4–5.6 IS STM was announced alongside the EOS 800D/Rebel T7i, 200D, and the 77D. It has a different optical formula from that of any previous Canon 18–55mm lens and a smaller aperture, which made it possible to reduce the lens' physical size.

Specifications

References

External links

Specifications
 Canon EF-S 18–55mm f/3.5–5.6 USM
 Canon EF-S 18–55mm f/3.5–5.6 IS

Reviews

18–55mm f/3.5–5.6 II
 photozone.de

18–55mm f/3.5–5.6 IS
 photozone.de
 SLRgear.com
 dpreview.com
 the-digital-picture.com

18–55mm f/3.5–5.6 IS II
 the-digital-picture.com

18–55mm f/3.5–5.6 USM
 imaging-resource.com

18–55mm f/3.5–5.6 IS STM
 the-digital-picture.com

18-55mm lens
Canon kit lenses
Year of introduction missing